Arctostaphylos montana is a species of manzanita. It is endemic to the San Francisco Bay area where it has been found on Mount Tamalpais and at the Presidio of San Francisco.

Taxonomy
Arctostaphylos montana has two subspecies, both of which were formerly considered as a subspecies of Hooker's manzanita until reclassified following modern genetic analysis and comparisons.
 Arctostaphylos montana subsp. montana Eastw. - Mt. Tamalpais manzanita - native to Mount Tamalpais
 Arctostaphylos montana subsp. ravenii (P.V.Wells) V.T.Parker, M.C.Vasey & J.E.Keeley - Presidio manzanita - one single plant and a few clones exist at the Presidio of San Francisco. Federally listed as an endangered subspecies of the United States.

References

montana
Endemic flora of California
Natural history of the California chaparral and woodlands
Natural history of the San Francisco Bay Area
Natural history of San Francisco
Endemic flora of the San Francisco Bay Area
Flora without expected TNC conservation status